The Netherlands were represented by 36 athletes at the 2010 European Athletics Championships held at the Estadi Olímpic Lluís Companys in Barcelona, Spain from 27 July to 1 August 2010.

Participants

Medal count

See also
Netherlands at other European Championships in 2010
 Netherlands at the 2010 UEC European Track Championships

References

External links 
 Participants list (men)
 Participants list (women)

2010
Nations at the 2010 European Athletics Championships
European Athletics Championships